The Conservatorio Nacional Superior de Música is the national music conservatory for Argentina and it is located in Buenos Aires.

History
Ernesto de la Guardia, a member of the Wagnerian Society of Buenos Aires, first proposed the creation of a national conservatory. He gained support from the president Marcelo Torcuato de Alvear and his wife Regina Pacini a noted soprano, the Conservatorio Nacional de Música y Declamación (National Conservatory of Music and Recitation) was founded by Argentine musician Carlos López Buchardo, among others, on July 7, 1924. Based upon the School of Lyric and Scenic Art held at the Teatro Colón in Buenos Aires, the conservatory focused on both lyric and theatrical studies, providing instruction in composition, vocal and instrument music, recitation and speech. The conservatory began its operations at the Teatro Colón. Within a few years, in 1930 the Conservatory relocated to the upper floors of the Teatro Nacional Cervantes. In 1928, renowned Russian prima ballerina, Elena Smirnova was hired as the first professor of dance of the Conservatory.

In 1939, the name was changed to the Conservatorio Nacional de Música y Arte Escénico (National Conservatory of Music and Performing Arts) and it was renamed again upon the death of Buchardo at the end of 1948. The conservatory was renamed to honor its first director, and has since been known as the Conservatorio Nacional de "Carlos López Buchardo". In 1950, the Dance Department was split from the organization with the founding of the National School of Dance and then between 1957 and 1958, the Theater Arts Department was separated from the Conservatory to create the National School of Theater. Moving several times in the 1940s, by 1982, the Conservatory established its current location (2017) in the Palacio Rocca Avenida Córdoba 2445.

Modern organization
The National Conservatoire was divided in 1989 into the present and independent Escuela Nacional de Música (basic and first levels) and the Conservatorio Nacional Superior de Música (middle and high levels).

In 1995, the middle level of the National Conservatorium is assigned to the government of the city of Buenos Aires, which is in 1998 named Conservatorio de Música de la Ciudad de Buenos Aires.

Alumni
 Alberto Ginastera – cello, piano, composition and conducting
 Gaston Rivero -  Operatic Tenor
Lita Spena - composer
 Sylvia Kersenbaum – piano
 Carlos Iván Cítera – piano
 Lilia Sánchez – Dalcroze Method
 Elias Goldzycher – piano
 Ana Lucia Frega – Music education
 Juan Maria Solare – piano, composition and conducting
 Jorge Alejandro Fernández – trumpet, singing and choreography
 Liliana Cangiano – piano, composition
 María Scheller Zambrano
 Elsa Berner – piano
 Polo Piatti – composer, piano
 Helen Glaisher-Hernandez - piano, arranger, academic MPhil (Cantab), Iberian and Latin American Music Society - Artistic Director

References

External links
Instituto Universitario Nacional del Arte (parent university) – Department of Musical and Audio Arts (Spanish)
Conservatoire's History (Spanish)
Conservatoire's Information (Spanish)
Buchardo Biography (Spanish)
Conservatorio de Buenos Aires (Spanish)

Music schools in Argentina
Education in Buenos Aires
Educational institutions established in 1924
1924 establishments in Argentina